My Childhood may refer to:

My Childhood (1972), the first in a trilogy of autobiographical films by Scottish filmmaker Bill Douglas
Min Fynske Barndom (1927), by Carl Nielsen, translated into English as My Childhood or as My Childhood Symphony
My Childhood (Gorky book), Detstvo (1914), by Maxim Gorky

See also
Detstvo (1852), by Leo Tolstoy, translated into English as Childhood